Shanghai Kid, sometimes titled The Shanghai Kid and known in Japan as , is a 1985 arcade fighting game developed by Nihon Game (now Culture Brain) and published by Taiyo System. It is the first game in the Hiryū no Ken series by Culture Brain.

Gameplay
Shanghai Kid uses an 8-way joystick and two buttons (one for punching and one for kicking).

Set in a tournament competition, players can perform power-punches, kicks, and slams, with martial arts, wrestling and kickboxing represented in the game. The game also makes use of voice sound effects.

It contributes to the fighting game genre by introducing the combo system and the ability to perform special moves.  When the spiked speech balloon that reads "RUSH!" pops up during battle, the player has a chance to rhythmically perform a series of combos called "rush-attacking", which would later be found in other fighting games such as SNK's the Art of Fighting and The King of Fighters series.  The special moves feature, unlike the basic moves one, allows players to perform moves that are more advanced than the basic ones, and by using two buttons simultaneously instead of one.

Reception 
In Japan, Game Machine listed Hiryū no Ken on their August 15, 1985 issue as being the third most successful table arcade unit of the month. In North America, Shanghai Kid was the sixth top-grossing software kit on the RePlay arcade charts in November 1985.

References

External links

Shanghai Kid at arcade-history

1985 video games
Arcade video games
Arcade-only video games
Culture Brain games
Data East arcade games
Fighting games
Hiryu no Ken
Multiplayer video games
Taito arcade games
Video games developed in Japan